Herbert Loren Johnson (July 10, 1928 – April 3, 2021) was an American football halfback who played for the New York Giants. He played college football at the University of Washington.

References

1928 births
2021 deaths
American football halfbacks
Army Black Knights football players
Washington Huskies football players
New York Giants players
Players of American football from Oregon